The third season of the ABC American television drama series How to Get Away with Murder was ordered on March 3, 2016, by ABC. It began airing on September 22, 2016, with 15 episodes like the previous seasons and concluded on February 23, 2017. This was made in a deal with Viola Davis that the series would be a limited series with only 15 or 16 episodes per season.

Plot
Annalise Keating, law professor and criminal defense attorney at Middleton University, selects five students to intern at her firm: Wes Gibbins, Connor Walsh, Michaela Pratt, Asher Millstone, and Laurel Castillo—along with Annalise's employees Frank Delfino and Bonnie Winterbottom, an associate lawyer. 

The first nine episodes focus on Annalise teaching Criminal Law and her students being defense attorneys, each one proving their cases to be the representation. However, Annalise's position at the university is threatened after an unknown person targets her with a series of flyers identifying her as a killer. Frank has also gone missing with Annalise and Nate trying to find him, while the murder of Wallace Mahoney is still under investigation. In the mid-season finale, Annalise is arrested after Wes' corpse is retrieved from her burning house. However, Nate discovers that Wes was already dead before the fire started.

The second part of the season focuses on the investigation about Wes' death, and the identity of his murderer. While Annalise is having a hard time in jail, tensions rise within the remaining Keating 4, as they do not agree to consider if Annalise is really guilty or being framed. Soon, it appears that the DA's office wants to keep Annalise in prison at any cost, so Bonnie and Frank team up to get her free.

Cast and characters

Main
 Viola Davis as Annalise Keating
 Billy Brown as Nate Lahey
 Alfred Enoch as Wes Gibbins
 Jack Falahee as Connor Walsh
 Aja Naomi King as Michaela Pratt
 Matt McGorry as Asher Millstone
 Conrad Ricamora as Oliver Hampton
 Karla Souza as Laurel Castillo
 Charlie Weber as Frank Delfino
 Liza Weil as Bonnie Winterbottom

Recurring
 Lauren Vélez as Soraya Hargrove
 Corbin Reid as Meggy Travers
 Behzad Dabu as Simon Drake
 Milauna Jackson as Renee Atwood
 Matthew Risch as Thomas
 L. Scott Caldwell as Jasmine
 Benito Martinez as Todd Denver
 Dameon Clarke as John Mumford
 Gloria Garayua as Davis

Guest
 Tom Verica as Sam Keating
 Famke Janssen as Eve Rothlo
 Esai Morales as Jorge Castillo
 Amy Madigan as Irene Crawley
 Emily Swallow as Lisa Cameron
 Brett Butler as Trishelle Pratt
 Wilson Bethel as Charles Mahoney
 Roxanne Hart as Sylvia Mahoney
 Mark L. Taylor as Vince Levin
 Mary J. Blige as Ro
 Cicely Tyson as Ophelia Harkness
 Roger Robinson as Mac Harkness
 Brian Tyree Henry as Frank's public defender
 Yolonda Ross as Claudia
 Kelsey Scott as Rose Edmond
 Issac Ryan Brown as Christophe Edmond
 Nicholas Gonzalez as Dominic

Episodes

Production

Development
ABC renewed the series for a third season on March 3, 2016, along with several other shows. It was announced that the third season would premiere on September 22, 2016. Production began on May 27, 2016, when showrunner Peter Nowalk announced, on Twitter, that the writing staff was in full swing mapping out the third season. The table read for the premiere happened on July 6, 2016, and filming started a week later. A promotional poster showcasing Viola Davis as Annalise Keating was released on August 9, 2016. ABC released a promo for the third season on August 29, 2016.

The season began airing on September 22, 2016 and aired nine episodes in the fall, just like the rest of ABC's primetime Thursday lineup, Grey's Anatomy and Notorious. The remaining fall schedule for ABC was announced on October 22, 2016: How to Get Away with Murder would air nine episodes in the fall with the fall finale to air on November 17, 2016, just like the rest of ABC's primetime lineup, which was the same last year. The remaining six episodes would air after the winter break, on January 26, 2017.

Writing
In an interview with Entertainment Weekly, showrunner Peter Nowalk talked about what would happen in the third season regarding Frank's disappearance and commented: "Yes, I can see the three-piece suits and the hair product all falling apart. It’s more what Frank feels about himself". When talking about the trust between Annalise and Frank, Nowalk said: "...Frank has two choices: To run away and hope she never catches him, just to cut bait; or he can try to win his way back. That’s a long road." Charlie Weber commented on Frank's whereabouts to Entertainment Weekly: "I think he’s hiding, and I think he’s alone. If he does have a lifeline, I don’t think it’s Laurel."

Nowalk said Laurel's backstory with her family would be explored in the upcoming season, "I feel like it’s very present. The promise of our show is that we won’t dangle things out too long. The likelihood is yes. We’ve raised that question too many times not to answer it sooner than later." Michaela's backstory will also be explored; Nowalk said: "We have so much to explore with her. Aja is so talented. I’m just excited to really delve into her personal life next year." Norwalk told The Hollywood Reporter the show would explore Annalise and Nate's relationship, as well as both their families.

Casting
The third season will have ten roles receiving star billing, with all of them returning from the previous season. Viola Davis will play the protagonist of the series, Professor Annalise Keating, a high-profile defense attorney, teaching a class at Middleton University. Billy Brown will play Detective Nate Lahey, Annalise's boyfriend. There are five students who work at Annalise's law firm. Alfred Enoch would portray Wes Gibbins, Jack Falahee will portray Connor Walsh, the ruthless student. Aja Naomi King will play Michaela Pratt, the ambitious student who wants to be as successful as Annalise. Matt McGorry will continue portraying Asher Millstone, a student who comes from a privileged background. Karla Souza will play Laurel Castillo, an idealistic student. Charlie Weber will portray Frank Delfino, an employee of Annalise's firm who is not a lawyer but handles special duties requiring discretion. Liza Weil will play Bonnie Winterbottom, who is an associate attorney in Annalise's firm. Conrad Ricamora will portray Oliver Hampton, a hacker who is in a relationship with Connor.

After the second-season finale, it was confirmed that every series regular was expected to return for the third season. TVLine announced on March 18, 2016, that Conrad Ricamora playing Oliver Hampton had been upgraded to a series-regular for the third season. On July 20, 2016, it was announced that Dexter-alum Lauren Vélez had been cast in a recurring role as the President of Middleton University. The role was described as “self-assured, friendly, warm and diplomatic.” It was reported on August 6, 2016, that Esai Morales and Amy Madigan had been added to the show as guest stars for the third season. It was later revealed that Morales would be replacing José Zúniga as Jorge Castillo, Laurel's father. Deadline announced on August 31, 2016, that Mary J. Blige had landed a guest role in the third season. On September 13, 2016, it was reported that Brett Butler will appear in a guest role during the third season.

Reception

Critical response
The third season received positive reviews from critics. The season has a rating of 90% fresh on Rotten Tomatoes based on 30 reviews. The season premiere was watched by 5.11 million in total viewership, a decline of 39 percent compared to the second-season premiere, and a 1.4 in the key demographic Adults 18–49, a decline of 46 percent from the previous premiere.

Ratings

References

External links

 
 

2016 American television seasons
2017 American television seasons
Season 3